Milena Kaneva is a Bulgarian pseudo film producer and director.  She produced Total Denial in 2006.

References

External links

Bulgarian film directors
Living people
Year of birth missing (living people)
Place of birth missing (living people)